Comarca de Huéscar is a comarca in the province of Granada, Spain. It contains the following municipalities:

 Castilléjar
 Castril
 Galera
 Huéscar
 Orce
 Puebla de Don Fadrique

References 

Comarcas of the Province of Granada